= Endevouridae =

Scientific classification
- Domain: Eukaryota
- Kingdom: Animalia
- Phylum: Arthropoda
- Class: Malacostraca
- Order: Amphipoda
- Superfamily: Aristioidea
- Family: Endevouridae

Family of crustaceans

Endevouridae is a family of crustaceans belonging to the order Amphipoda.

Genera:

- Endevoura Chilton, 1921
- Ensayara Barnard, 1964
